Vá Luen (Traditional Chinese: 華聯) is a Macau football club, which plays in the Macau. They play in the Macau's second division, the Campeonato da 2ª Divisão do Futebol.

History
They played the 2010 season in the Macau's first division, the Campeonato da 1ª Divisão do Futebol and was relegated in November 2010.

Notes

Football clubs in Macau